Yunist Chernihiv is a Ukrainian amateur football team based on Yunist sports school in Chernihiv. The sports school is known for its talent players like Andriy Yarmolenko, Pavlo Polehenko, Serhiy Kovalenko, Vladyslav Shapoval, Pavlo Fedosov, Yuriy Maley, Oleksiy Khoblenko, Dmytro MyronenkoAndriy Fedorenko, and Nika Sichinava.

The sports school fields its men team in Chernihiv Oblast football competitions and its women team Yunist ShVSM in amateur competition of the Ukrainian Women's Football First League.

History
The team was founded in 2000 and in 2016-17 got second in the Chernihiv Oblast Football Championship. In 2004 the team beat Yunist Dinaz Vyshhorod for 1-0 at the Yunist Stadium and in 2006 Yunist Chernihiv won 4-2 always against Dinaz.

In 2018 the team won 2-1 against Premier Niva (Vinnytsia) and the team got second in the Chernihiv Oblast Football Championship. The Football school "Youth" from Chernihiv received 136 thousand euros from Chernihiv received 136 thousand euros for Yarmolenko.

In 2020, the renewed "Youth" will create a museum of football history with a separate exhibition about Andriy Yarmolenko, photo-1
According to him, the exposition about the famous football player will feature cups, medals, T-shirts, photos and other things from different periods of sports life - from studying at the Chernihiv sports school to the present time.

On 8 June 2021, the club for the first time in the history of Chernihiv football, the young men from the Yunost team won the Ukrainian Youth Football League of U-14 championship. The team, beat their peers - "Zirka" from Kropyvnytskyi with a score of 1: 2. The match took place in Ternopil. The best goalkeeper of the tournament was the player of "Youth" Rustam Baev, the best striker was another pupil of Chernihiv football Nikita Dorosh.

Facilities and venue
The team plays in the Yunist stadium that recently has been redeveloped with Tribunes for 3,000 seats. The renovation cost ₴55 million in 2019.

Notable players

Coaches
  Mykola Lypoviy (2000–2003)
  Vladimir Kulik (2003–2010)
  Yuriy Melashenko (2010–2013)
  Viktor Lazarenko (2013)
  Serhiy Bukhonin (2013–Present)

See also
 List of sport teams in Chernihiv
 FC Desna Chernihiv
 FC Desna-2 Chernihiv
 FC Desna-3 Chernihiv
 SDYuShOR Desna
 FC Chernihiv
 Lehenda Chernihiv

References

External links
  unist.cn.ua/ 
  yunost.at.ua
  map.cn.ua/
  goldtalant.com.ua/

 
2000 establishments in Ukraine
Football clubs in Chernihiv
Football academies in Ukraine